George Sydenham Clarke, 1st Baron Sydenham of Combe,  (4 July 1848 – 7 February 1933) was a British Army officer and colonial administrator. He later wrote antisemitic and racist pamphlets for the British far right, as well as at least one novel in 1891.

Biography

Background and education
Clarke was born in Lincolnshire, and educated at Haileybury, Wimbledon and the Royal Military Academy, Woolwich.

Military career
Clarke entered the Royal Engineers in 1868, served in the Egyptian Expedition and as Assistant Political officer during the following Sudan expedition.

From 1885 until 1892 Clarke was secretary to the Colonial Defence Committee, for which he was knighted as a Knight Commander of the Order of St Michael and St George (KCMG) in 1893. He was also secretary to the Royal Commission on Navy and Army Administration in 1888, a commission which did much to improve cooperation between the two services. In the late 1890s he was Superintendent of the Royal Carriage Department at Woolwich.

Colonial administrator
Clarke retired from the army in October 1901, when he had been appointed Governor of Victoria the previous month. He arrived in Melbourne and took the oath of office on 11 December 1901, and served in Australia until 1903. He served in India as Governor of Bombay between 1907 and 1913. A fine statue of him stands at the entrance to the Institute of Science College, located next to the Oval Maidan (Oval Park), South Bombay. In 1913 he was elevated to the peerage as Baron Sydenham of Combe, of Dulverton in the County of Devon, named after one of the ancient seats of the ancient de Sydenham family which originated at the manor of Sydenham, near Bridgwater in Somerset. After his last term as governor he was a member of the committee that issued the Esher Report. The biographer of the committee's chairman describes Clarke as "...an insensitive, clumsy, uncouth and infinitely boring man..". Clarke was also the first Secretary of the Committee of Imperial Defence.

Fascism and antisemitism
Originally a Liberal, Clarke became increasingly radical in his later life; by the 1930s he was a prominent supporter of fascist and antisemitic causes.

Clarke wrote antisemitic, racist and pro-fascist pieces, including a pamphlet of antisemitic canards called "The World Jewish Problem." He kept up an active correspondence with Adrian Arcand, the self-described "Canadian Führer"; Clarke quietly sent Arcand funds for translating the tract into French. Clarke's writings were published by The Britons, an antisemitic British Fascist organisation founded in 1919 by Henry Hamilton Beamish. According to historian Sharman Kadish, The Britons was "the most extreme group disseminating anti-Semitic propaganda in the early 1920s - indeed the first organisation set up in Britain for this express purpose."

Views on fortification

In 1892 Clarke published Fortification: Its Past Achievement, Recent Development and Future Progress. The book was influential in shaping the British view of military fortification. Clarke adhered to the 'Blue Water' school of thought which saw the Royal Navy as Britain's primary defence against invasion. Large scale permanent fortifications built in peacetime (such as the Palmerston Forts) were seen as a waste of money. Instead Clarke advocated the use of small field fortifications which could be built cheaply and rapidly, such as those based on the Twydall Profile. 

His view was based in part on the successful defence of Plevna in 1877 by Turkish forces using magazine-fed rifles and earthwork fortifications. Also, in 1882 following the heavy bombardment of the forts at Alexandria by the British Mediterranean Fleet, Clarke, as an engineer officer, had been given the task of assessing the damage to the forts. He found the bombardment had had very little effect on the earthwork defences with only 20 of the 300 guns having been dismounted. 

Returning from the Mediterranean, Clarke was appointed to a group of officers tasked with the planning of British coast defences overseas. Sydenham-Clarke's opinions on the strength of field fortifications were largely vindicated by the trench warfare of the First World War (1914–1918).

Fiction
In 1891 his book The Last Great Naval War. An historical retrospect. By A. Nelson Seaforth. Sixth thousand was published. The book was a fictional account of a war between Britain and France, set in 1930.

Personal life

On 1 June 1871, he married Caroline Emily, eldest daughter of General Peregrine Henry Fellowes, RM. She died on 9 December 1908. Their only child, Constance Violet Clarke, was born 26 May 1879 and died 21 March 1909. He married, secondly, in 1910, to Phyllis Angelina Reynolds, daughter of George Morant of Shirley House, Carrickmacross. 

Lord Sydenham of Combe died at his home in Onslow Square, London, in February 1933, aged 84, when the barony became extinct. He was cremated at Golders Green Crematorium.

References

External links
 
 
 Sir George Sydenham Clarke at the Australian Dictionary of Biography
 

1848 births
1933 deaths
Barons in the Peerage of the United Kingdom
British Army personnel of the Anglo-Egyptian War
British Army personnel of the Mahdist War
Fellows of the Royal Society
Governors of Victoria (Australia)
People educated at Haileybury and Imperial Service College
Governors of Bombay
Graduates of the Royal Military College, Sandhurst
Knights Grand Commander of the Order of the Indian Empire
Knights Grand Commander of the Order of the Star of India
Knights Grand Cross of the Order of St Michael and St George
Knights Grand Cross of the Order of the British Empire
People educated at Rossall School
Military personnel from Lincolnshire
Royal Engineers officers
English fascists
Barons created by George V